Beta trigyna, called the Caucasian wild beet and the Turkish wild beet, is a species of Beta native to Bulgaria, Iran, Romania, the Transcaucasus, Turkey (including the European portion), Turkmenistan, Ukraine (including Crimea), and the former Yugoslavia, and occurring in waste places elsewhere in Europe. It is a hexaploid (2n=54) that usually reproduces by apomixis.

References

trigyna
Plants described in 1800